Fangge Dupan (9 March 1927 – 10 March 2016) was a Taiwanese poet. Born to a prestigious Hakka family in Xinpu, Hsinchu, she began writing as a teenager in high school. Most of her early work is written in Japanese because she was educated in that language. Due to political pressure, she stopped writing in Japanese and did not publish until the 1960s, in Mandarin. In the late 1980s, Fangge Dupan turned to her native Hakka language.

Her main works are Ghost Festival (中元節), PinAn Drama (平安戲), Paper Man (紙人), and Vegetable Garden (菜園).

Life and career 
Fangge Dupan's family was a prestigious family in Xinpu, Hsinchu. Her grandfather, Pan Cheng-chien, was chief of the village during the Japanese colonial period. Her father, Pan Chin-wei, studied law in Tokyo. Her mother, a native of Kansai, Hsinchu, was adopted and attended Third Taipei Girl's High School. Fangge Dupan's background influenced her writing greatly.

Fangge Dupan was born in Xinpu, Hsinchu on 9 March 1927. She had three younger sisters and three younger brothers. The family moved to Japan with her father soon after she was born and returned to Taiwan in 1934. Due to her background, she was able to enter the "elite primary school" , normally for Japanese, for aristocratic education. There, she was bullied by Japanese schoolmates. Fangge began attending National Hsinchu Girls' Senior High School in 1940, where she continued to face bullies. She attempted to get along with her Japanese classmates, and started writing in Japanese, including poems, novels and prose.

After leaving Hsinchu, Fangge Dupan enrolled in Taipei Girls Senior High School. At school for two years, the classes included domestic arts such as: ikebana, the tea ceremony, sewing and knitting, as well as literature and history. As a whole, Taipei Girls Senior High School's educational mission was to develop humble, virtuous women to serve husbands and educate children. What she learned in Taipei inspired Fangge Dupan to ponder the status of women, which became a recurring theme in her writings. After World War II, she returned to Xinpu to teach junior high school. There, she met her future husband, Dr. Du Ching-shou. By 1946, Fangge Dupan stopped writing in Japanese because the Kuomintang had banned the use of that language. In the 1947 228 Incident, her maternal uncle Chang Chi-liang, and two other people were killed by the Kuomintang. The loss of family members affected Fangge Dupan's work deeply; she expressed an ironic attitude towards politics in her work. The next year, Fangge Dupan married Du despite opposition from her family. She and Du moved to Chungli, Taoyuan. Fangge Dupan worked at her husband's clinic, while writing articles as a freelancer. She did not publish under her own name until the 1960s, when she began writing in Mandarin. This language shift marks Fangge Dupan as a member of what writer  called the "translingual generation" in 1967, Taiwanese writers who were educated in Japanese while Taiwan was governed by Japan, but later published in Mandarin Chinese as the Kuomintang asserted control of Taiwan.

In 1965, Fangge Dupan joined the Bamboo Hat Poetry Society. On 17 September 1967, her husband was badly injured in a car accident, but recovered. Fangge Dupan, a Christian, turned to religious works, and began preaching. In May 1982, Fangge Dupan became an American citizen.  She began writing in Hakka in 1989. In 1992, her poem 遠千湖 written in Mandarin, English and Japanese was awarded the first Chen Xiuxi Poetry Prize.

On 10 March 2016, Fangge Dupan died at home at the age of 89. A memorial was held on 19 March at the Presbyterian Church in Zhongli, where she was posthumously presented with a presidential citation by Hakka Affairs Council minister Chung Wan-mei.

References 

1927 births
2016 deaths
Taiwanese poets
Taiwanese women writers
People from Hsinchu County
People from Taoyuan District
Taiwanese feminists
Taiwanese Presbyterians
Taiwanese people of Hakka descent
Hakka writers
Writers from Taoyuan City
Taiwanese women poets
Japanese-language writers